Beatrice de Montfort, Countess of Montfort-l'Amaury (December 1249 – 9 March 1312) was a ruling sovereign countess of Montfort from 1249 until 1312. She was also countess of Dreux by marriage to Robert IV, Count of Dreux. She was the ancestor of the Dukes of Brittany from the House of Montfort-Dreux which derived its name from her title.

Life 
Beatrice was born sometime between December 1248 and 1249, the only child of John I of Montfort, Count of Dreux and Jeanne, Dame de Chateaudun.

Reign
In 1249, Beatrice's father died in Cyprus, while participating in the Seventh Crusade. Thus, Beatrice succeeded her father as ruling countess of Montfort at the age of about one year old.

In 1251, Jeanne married her second husband, John II of Brienne, Grand Butler of France. Jeanne and John had a daughter, Blanche de Brienne, Baroness Tingry (1252–1302); Blanche married William II de Fiennes, Baron of Tingry. Jeanne died sometime after 1252, leaving Beatrice and her half-sister Blanche as her co-heiresses.

Beatrice was married to Robert IV, Count of Dreux, Braine and Montfort-l'Amaury in 1260, when she was about eleven years old. He was the son of John I, Count of Dreux and Braine, and Marie de Bourbon. As was the custom for female rulers at this point in time, he became the co-ruler with Beatrice and Count of Montfort by right of his wife after their wedding.

Death 
Beatrice died on 9 March 1312 at the age of around sixty-three. She was buried in the Abbaye de Haute-Bruyère.

Issue
Beatrice and Robert had:
 Marie of Dreux (1261/62–1276), in 1275 married Mathieu de Montmorency
 Yolande de Dreux (1263–1323), Countess of Montfort, married, firstly, on 15 October 1285, King Alexander III of Scotland, and, secondly, in 1292, Arthur II, Duke of Brittany
 John II of Dreux (1265–1309)
 Joan of Dreux, Countess of Braine, married, firstly, Jean IV de Roucy, and, secondly, John of Bar
 Beatrice of Dreux, abbess of Port-Royal-des-Champs (1270–1328)
 Robert of Dreux, seigneur of Chateau-du-Loire.

Ancestry

References

Sources

1240s births
1312 deaths
13th-century French people
14th-century French people
13th-century women rulers
14th-century women rulers
Montfort-l'Amaury, Countess of, Beatrice
House of Montfort
Countesses of Dreux
13th-century French women
14th-century French women